The Belles of St. Clements is a 1936 British drama film directed by Ivar Campbell and starring Evelyn Foster, Meriel Forbes and Basil Langton. It is a melodrama set inside a teacher training college.

Cast
 Evelyn Foster ...  Eve Chester
 Meriel Forbes ...  Natalie de Mailliere
 Basil Langton ...  Billy Grant
 Isobel Scaife ...  Maisie Carstairs
 Enid Lindsey ...  Miss Nelson
 Sonia Somers ...  Miss Grant
 Heather White ...  Betty Green
 Tosca von Bissing ...  Countess de Mailliere
 Donald Gray ...  Albert de Courcey
 Arthur Metcalfe ...  Count de Mailliere
 Frederick Bradshaw ...  Mr. Garth
 Eileen Munro ...  Mrs. Carstairs

References

External links

1936 films
1936 drama films
British drama films
Films produced by Anthony Havelock-Allan
Films directed by Ivar Campbell
Paramount Pictures films
Films with screenplays by Terence Rattigan
British black-and-white films
British and Dominions Studios films
Films shot at Imperial Studios, Elstree
1930s English-language films
1930s British films
English-language drama films